Condamine may refer to any of the following:

Places
Condamine is the name of several communes in France:
 Condamine, in the Ain département
 Condamine, in the Jura département
 La Condamine-Châtelard, in the Alpes-de-Haute-Provence département
Condamine may also refer to:
 La Condamine, a quartier (ward) of Monaco
 Condamine River in Australia
Condamine, Queensland, an Australian town on the Condamine River.
Electoral district of Condamine, Queensland, Australia

People
Charles Marie de La Condamine (1701-1774), French explorer, geographer and mathematician.
 Robert "Robin" de la Condamine (1877-1966), British actor who used the stage name Robert Farquharson.

In arts
Condamine is also a fictional drug in the Instrumentality of Mankind universe of science-fiction author Cordwainer Smith.